Introducing... Stan Walker is the debut studio album by season seven Australian Idol winner, Stan Walker. It was released through Sony Music Australia via its RCA Records label on 7 December 2009. The album contained the selected songs Walker performed during the top twelve on Australian Idol, as well as the two original songs, "Black Box" and "Think of Me". The album debuted at number two on the New Zealand Albums Chart and was certified triple platinum by the Recording Industry Association of New Zealand (RIANZ). It also appeared on the Australian ARIA Albums Chart at number three and was certified platinum by the Australian Recording Industry Association (ARIA). Preceding the album's release, lead single "Black Box" was released for digital download on 22 November 2009. The song appeared on the singles charts of Australia and New Zealand at numbers two and one, respectively.

Background
The album was recorded in two days after Walker became the winner of the seventh season of Australian Idol. The album featured the selected songs that Walker had performed throughout the season, as well as the two original songs "Black Box" and "Think of Me", which was produced by the first Australian Idol winner, Guy Sebastian. In an interview with Herald Sun, Walker explained that he wanted to put his favourite performance of Beyoncé's "Single Ladies (Put a Ring on It)" on the album but could not. "I couldn't put it on there because I didn't have a big band to do it. It was too much for people to arrange in time ... it was the hardest song I've ever had to do."

Reception and release 
Cameron Adams from Herald Sun awarded the album three and a half out of five stars, writing that, "here's your swift introduction to that voice singing classic songs. Now comes the real test – to write or find some of his own". On the New Zealand Albums Chart, Introducing... Stan Walker debuted at number two on 14 December 2009, where it remained for six consecutive weeks. The album was certified triple platinum by the Recording Industry Association of New Zealand (RIANZ), for selling 45,000 copies. In Australia, the album debuted at number three on the ARIA Albums Chart on 21 December 2009. It was certified platinum by the Australian Recording Industry Association (ARIA), for selling 70,000 copies.

Singles 
"Black Box" was released as the album's lead single on 22 November 2009. The song peaked at number one on the New Zealand Singles Chart for ten consecutive weeks. "Black Box" was certified double platinum by Recording Industry Association of New Zealand (RIANZ), for selling 30,000 copies. In Australia, "Black Box" debuted and peaked at number two on the ARIA Singles Chart. It was certified double platinum by the Australian Record Industry Association (ARIA), for selling 140,000 copies.

Track listing

Charts and certifications

Weekly charts

Certifications

Year-end charts

Release history

References

Stan Walker albums
2009 debut albums
RCA Records albums
Sony Music Australia albums
Albums produced by Cutfather